Selyankino is a rural locality (a village) in Saryevskoye Rural Settlement, Vyaznikovsky District, Vladimir Oblast, Russia. The population was 18 as of 2010.

Geography 
Selyankino is located 37 km northwest of Vyazniki (the district's administrative centre) by road. Saryeyvo is the nearest rural locality.

References 

Rural localities in Vyaznikovsky District